Adult entertainment may refer to:

the activity of the sex industry
Adult Entertainment (album) by Raffi, 1977
AVN Adult Entertainment Expo, annual convention in Nevada, U.S.

See also
Adult contemporary (disambiguation)